Rosera Assembly constituency is an assembly constituency in Samastipur district in the Indian state of Bihar. The seat is reserved for scheduled castes.

Overview
As per Delimitation of Parliamentary and Assembly constituencies Order, 2008, No. 139 Rosera Assembly constituency is composed of the following: Rosera community development block; Phulhara, Lilhaul, Singhia-I, Singhia-II, Singhia-III, Mahen, Wari, Nirpur Bhaririya, Bangarahta, Hardiya, Mahra and Keothar of gram panchayats of Singhia CD Block; Shankarpur, Jakhar Dharampur, Ghiwahi, Dasaut, Rahiar North, Rahiar South, Ballipur, Bandhar, Karain, Raniparti and Rajaur Rambhadrapur gram panchayats of Shivaji Nagar CD Block.

Rosera Assembly constituency (रोसड़ा / रोसरा) is part of No. 23 Samastipur (Lok Sabha constituency).

Members of Vidhan Sabha 
 1977 : Prayag Mandal (Independent)
 1980 : Ramashray Rai (Congress)
 1985 : Bhola Mandar (Lok Dal)
 1990 : Gajendra Prasad Singh (Janta Dal)
 1995 : Gajendra Prasad Singh (Janta Dal)
 2000 : Ashok Kumar (JD-U)
 2005 (Feb.) : Gajendra Prasad Singh(RJD)
 2005 (Oct.) : Gajendra Prasad Singh(RJD)
 2010 : Manju Hajari (BJP)
 2015 : Dr. Ashok Kumar (INC)
 2020 : Birendra Kumar (BJP)
2025 :

Election results

2020

1977-2010
In the 2016 Election 
Mahagathbandhan in Bihar seat went to 
Congress .
Dr. Ashok Kumar won the Rosera seat defeating his nearest rival Manju Hajari.

In the 2010 state assembly elections, Manju Hajari of BJP won the Rosera seat defeating her nearest rival Pitamber Paswan of RJD. Contests in most years were multi cornered but only winners and runners up are being mentioned. Gajendra Prasad Singh of RJD defeated Ashok Kumar of JD(U) in October 2005 and February 2005. Ashok Kumar of JD(U) defeated Gajendra Prasad Singh of RJD in 2000. Gajendra Prasad Singh of Janata Dal defeated Ramashray Roy of Congress in 1995 and Rama Kant Jha of Congress in 1990. Bhola Mandar of Lok Dal defeated Satyendra Narain Choudhary of Congress in 1985. Ramashray Rai of Congress (I) defeated Ram Lakhan Singh of Janata Party (SC) in 1980. Prayag Mandal, Independent, defeated Ramashay Rai of Congress in 1977.

References

External links
 

Assembly constituencies of Bihar
Politics of Samastipur district